The 2012 United States Senate election in Nebraska took place on November 6, 2012, concurrently with the 2012 U.S. presidential election as well as other elections to the United States Senate and House of Representatives and various state and local elections.

Incumbent Democratic U.S. Senator Ben Nelson chose to retire instead of seeking a third term.
Former U.S. Senator Bob Kerrey, a Democrat, and state senator Deb Fischer, a Republican, won their respective parties' primary elections on May 15, 2012.

Fischer won the general election with 58% of the vote. Her election marked the first time since 1970 that a Republican was elected to Nebraska's Class 1 Senate seat, as well as the first time that a woman was elected to a full Senate term in the state's history. This was the only seat the Republicans flipped during this cycle.

Democratic primary

Candidates

Declared 
 Bob Kerrey, former U.S. Senator and former governor of Nebraska
 Steven Lustgarten, video production company owner
 Larry Marvin, landlord and perennial candidate
 Sherman Yates

Withdrew 
 Chuck Hassebrook, Regent of the University of Nebraska

Declined 
 Chris Beutler, Mayor of Lincoln
 Jane Kleeb, founder and director of Bold Nebraska
 Scott Kleeb, businessman, Democratic nominee for the 3rd congressional district in 2006 and for the U.S. Senate in 2008
 Steve Lathrop, state senator
 Ben Nelson, incumbent U.S. senator
 Kim Robak, former lieutenant governor

Endorsements

Results

Republican primary

Candidates 
 Jon Bruning, Attorney General of Nebraska
 Sharyn Elander
 Deb Fischer, state senator
 Pat Flynn, financial adviser
 Don Stenberg, treasurer of Nebraska, former attorney general of Nebraska and nominee for the U.S. Senate in 2000
 Spencer Zimmerman, truck driver and Air Force veteran

Declined 
 Bob Bennie, businessman
 Rex Fisher, businessman
 Mike Flood, speaker of the Nebraska Legislature
 Jeff Fortenberry, U.S. representative
 Dave Heineman, Governor of Nebraska
 Kay Orr, former governor of Nebraska
 Mike Simmonds, businessman
 Adrian Smith, U.S. Representative
 Lee Terry, U.S. Representative

Polling

Endorsements

Results

General election

Candidates 
 Bob Kerrey, (Democrat), former U.S. senator and former governor of Nebraska
 Deb Fischer, (Republican), state senator

Debates 
The first debate took place at the Heartland Events Center during the Nebraska State Fair at 4 p.m. Saturday, August 25, 2012. Kerrey and Fischer participated.

The second debate took place on September 28, 2012, KETV-TV, Chamber of Commerce of Greater Omaha. Kerrey and Fischer participated.

The third debate took place on October 1, 2012, NET-TV. Kerrey and Fischer participated. Topics included agriculture policy, the economy, taxes and education.
External links
 Complete video at Grand Island Independent, first debate, August 25, 2012
 Complete video of debate, September 28, 2012 - C-SPAN
 Complete video of debate, October 1, 2012 - C-SPAN

Fundraising

Top contributors

Top industries

Predictions

Polling 

 With Kerrey

With Lathrop

With Nelson

With Robak

Results

By county 
From Secretary of State of Nebraska

See also 
 2012 United States Senate elections
 2012 United States House of Representatives elections in Nebraska

References

External links 
 Elections from the Nebraska Secretary of State
 Campaign contributions at OpenSecrets.org
 Outside spending at Sunlight Foundation
 Candidate issue positions at On the Issues
 Election news coverage at the Omaha World-Herald

Official campaign websites
 Russell Anderson for U.S. Senate
 Deb Fischer for U.S. Senate
 Bob Kerrey for U.S. Senate

2012 Nebraska elections
Nebraska
2012